Actéon was a French Navy  of the M6 ​​series commissioned in 1932. She participated in World War II, first on the side of the Allies from 1939 to June 1940, then in the navy of Vichy France. She was sunk in November 1942.

Characteristics

Actéon was part of a fairly homogeneous series of 31 deep-sea patrol submarines also called "1,500-tonners" because of their displacement. All entered service between 1931 and 1939.

They displaced  on the surface and  underwater. When submerged, their two electric motors produced a combined  and allowed them to reach .

Construction and commissioning

Laid down at Ateliers et Chantiers de la Loire in Saint-Nazaire, France, on 20 July 1927 with the hull number Q149, Actéon was launched on 10 April 1929. She was commissioned on 18 December 1931.

Service history

World War II

French Navy
At the start of World War II in September 1939, Actéon was assigned to the 3rd Submarine Division based at Toulon, France. At the beginning of February 1940, the 3rd Submarine Division transferred briefly to Casablanca in French Morocco to patrol off the Canary Islands, where the Allies believed that German cargo ships had taken refuge at the beginning of the war and were serving as supply ships for German U-boats.

On 12 April 1940, Actéon was transferred to the Mediterranean Sea, based first at Bizerte in Tunisia and then at Beirut in the French Mandate for Syria and Lebanon, from which she operated under the command of the British Commander-in-Chief, Mediterranean Fleet, Admiral Andrew Cunningham, at Alexandria, Egypt. She patrolled in the Dodecanese between Leros and Rhodes.

German ground forces advanced into France on 10 May 1940, beginning the Battle of France, and Italy declared war on France on 10 June 1940 and joined the invasion. When the Battle of France ended in France's defeat and an armistice with Germany and Italy which went into effect on 25 June 1940, Actéon was recalled to Beirut.

Vichy France
After France's surrender, Actéon served in the naval forces of Vichy France. Her batteries and those of Acheron were in poor condition, but repairing or replacing them was impossible at Beirut. Escorted by the netlayer , the two submarines departed Beirut on 16 October 1940 bound for Toulon, which they reached on 24 October 1940. Actéon then was placed under guard at Toulon in accordance with the terms of the armistice.

In 1941, Actéon was transferred to Dakar in Senegal. While returning to Dakar from a reconnaissance mission she attempted on 27 and 28 July 1941 to intercept and seize the Norwegian cargo ship Lidward, which had escaped internment at Dakar, but she mistakenly began tracking a different ship and failed to find Lidward. A British aircraft sighted Actéon and ordered her to stop, but she ignored the order and proceeded to Dakar.

By 1 November 1942, only Fresnel was still assigned to the division with her.

The submarines of the 5th Submarine Division received orders to proceed to Toulon on 8 November 1942 to undergo a major overhaul, but Actéon and Pascal were still in French North Africa at Oran in Algeria that day when Allied forces landed on the coast of North Africa in Operation Torch. At 02:05 on 8 November, Actéon and Fresnel received orders to put to sea and oppose the landings, and they got underway between 03:15 and 03:45. Actéon soon reached her patrol area off the coast of Algeria east of Cape Falcon.

Loss
She penetrated their outer escort screen, then surfaced so that she could achieve a better attack position. Actéon submerged immediately.

References

Citations

Bibliography

 
 
 
 

Redoutable-class submarines (1928)
1929 ships
Ships built in France
World War II submarines of France
Maritime incidents in November 1942
Ships lost with all hands
Submarines sunk by British warships
Lost submarines of France
World War II shipwrecks in the Mediterranean Sea